Lygodactylus grotei, also known commonly as Grote's dwarf gecko, is a species of lizard in the family Gekkonidae. The species is native to East Africa and Southern Africa. There are two recognized subspecies.

Etymology
The specific name, grotei, is in honor of German ornithologist Hermann Grote, who collected the holotype of the species.

The subspecific name, pakenhami, is in honor of R. H. W. Pakenham, who collected the holotype of the subspecies.

Geographic range
L. grotei is found in Tanzania and northern Mozambique.

Subspecies
Two subspecies are recognized as being valid, including the nominotypical subspecies.
Lygodactylus grotei grotei 
Lygodactylus grotei pakenhami

References

Further reading
Loveridge A (1941). "New Geckos (Phelsuma & Lygodactylus), Snake (Leptotyphlops), and Frog (Phrynobatrachus) from Pemba Island, East Africa". Proceedings of the Biological Society of Washington 54: 175–178. (Lygodactylus grotei pakenhami, new subspecies, pp. 176–177).
Spawls, Stephen; Howell, Kim; Hinkel, Harald; Menegon, Michele (2018). Field Guide to East African Reptiles, Second Edition. London: Bloomsbury Natural History. 624 pp. . (Lygodactylus grotei, p. 105).
Sternfeld R (1911). "Zur Reptilian-Fauna Deutsch-Ostafrikas ". Sitzungsberichte der Gesellschaft Naturforschender Fruende zu Berlin 1911: 244–251. (Lygodactylus grotei, new species, p. 245). (in German).

Lygodactylus
Reptiles of Mozambique
Reptiles of Tanzania
Taxa named by Richard Sternfeld
Reptiles described in 1911